Tigran Benikovich Avanesyan (born 13 April 2002) is a Russian football player of Armenian descent who plays as a defensive midfielder for FC Baltika Kaliningrad on loan from PFC CSKA Moscow.

Club career
He joined the junior teams of PFC CSKA Moscow in 2015, and was first included in their Russian Premier League squad in February 2017, but did not make any appearances for the senior squad in the next 4 years.

On 20 February 2021, he was loaned to Russian Premier League club FC Tambov until the end of the 2020–21 season.

He made his debut for Tambov on 21 February 2021 in a Russian Cup game against FC Lokomotiv Moscow. He made his Russian Premier League debut on 26 February 2021 in a game against FC Rotor Volgograd.

On 1 June 2021, CSKA signed a new contract with Avanesyan that will run throughout the 2025–26 season.

On 7 September 2021, he joined FC Tekstilshchik Ivanovo on loan.

On 9 June 2022, Avanesyan was loaned to FC Baltika Kaliningrad, where he already played on junior levels, for the 2022–23 season.

International career
He represented Russia at the 2019 UEFA European Under-17 Championship and appeared in all 3 games as Russia was eliminated at group stage.

References

External links
 
 

2002 births
Sportspeople from Kaliningrad
Russian people of Armenian descent
Living people
Russian footballers
Russia youth international footballers
Association football midfielders
PFC CSKA Moscow players
FC Tambov players
FC Tekstilshchik Ivanovo players
FC Baltika Kaliningrad players
Russian Premier League players
Russian First League players
Russian Second League players